Serkan Altunorak (born 24 December 1976) is a Turkish actor.

Life and career 
Altunorak is a graduate of Hacettepe University with a degree in theatre studies. He later studied performing arts and graduated from Mimar Sinan University Conservatory.

He made his debut on television in 1999 with his role in Ayrılsak da Beraberiz as Unisex Bekir. In 2006 he appeared in İmkansız Aşk as Cem, and in the same year played the role of Tolga in the movie Gomeda, which marked his cinematic debut. In 2007 he was cast in Kara Duvak as Merdan. In the following year, he appeared in the TV series Sınıf as Umut and also had the lead role in the adaptation of Mercury Fur in Turkey. In 2009 he portrayed a conservatory student in the TV series Melekler Korusun and went on stage again with a role in the play Alışveriş ve S***ş.

In the meantime he play in Sezen Aksu's music video "Yanmışım Sönmüşüm Ben", directed by Fatih Akın. He also made guest appearances in the TV series Yaseminname, Çocuklar Duymasın and Karım ve Annem.

In October 2006, he had to play Russian roulette in a scene of the TV series İmkansız Aşk, in which he starred with Ebru Gündeş. Altunorak, who put the gun to his head, collapsed to the ground in blood as soon as he pulled the trigger. He was seriously injured as the pistol was still loaded and he was treated for a long time. The series was subsequently cancelled.

In 2011, he had the role of Suat in Bir Günah Gibi. He had his breakthrough with his portrayal of Taşlıcalı Yahya in the historical drama series Muhteşem Yüzyıl.

Filmography

Television

Film

As voice actor

Theatre

Awards and nominations

References

External links 
 
 

1976 births
Turkish male film actors
Turkish male stage actors
Turkish male television actors
Turkish male voice actors
Living people
Hacettepe University Ankara State Conservatory alumni
Mimar Sinan Fine Arts University alumni
Male actors from Ankara